The Methodist Girls' School, Ipoh (abbreviated MGS Ipoh) is an all-girls secondary school in Ipoh, Malaysia. It was founded by the Reverend William Edward Horley in 1895 as the Anglo-Chinese Girls' School.

Headmistresses
 Ms. Grace Towers (Mrs. A. Claessen) [1895 - 1901]
 Mrs. Luering [1902 - 1904]
 Mrs. Rutledge [1906]
 Ms. Ethel Parks [1911]
 Ms. Lydia Urech [1911 - 1915]
 Ms. Carrie C. Kenyon [1916,1920 - 1927]
 Ms. Minnie L. Rank [1927 - 1932]
 Ms. Thelma Ashley (Mrs. Watson) [1932]
 Ms. Florence Kleinhenn (Mrs. R. A. Kesselring) [1933,1934,1936]
 Ms. Thirza E. Bunce [1933 - 1934]
 Ms. Virginia Lake [1935]
 Ms. Gazelle Traeger [1936 - 1941]
 Ms. Edna Dahlin (Mrs. C. Foss) [1941]
 Ms. Daisy Moreira [1945 - 1959]
 Ms. Ann Harder [1960 - 1962]
 Ms. Ruth Ho A.M.N. [1963 - 1971]
 Mrs. Gloriosa Rajendran [1973]
 Ms. Chong Nyuk Mui P.J.K. [1974 - 1988]
 Ms. Yin Kam Yoke P.P.N. [1988 - 1998]
 Mrs. Lily Chin [1998 - 2001]
 Mdm. Lee Ah Kim [2001 - 2004]
 Mrs. Siva Prasanna d/o Krishnan (Mrs. Chandra) [2004 - 2006]
 Mrs. Soot Mooy Ching [2006 - 2011]
 Mdm. Nalini d/o Achuthan Nair [2011 - 2012]
 Datin Mungit Kaur d/o Dalip Singh [2012 - 2015]
 Mrs. Gan Lee Lee [2017 - ]

References

External links

Primary schools in Malaysia
Secondary schools in Malaysia
1895 establishments in British Malaya
Educational institutions established in 1895
Methodist schools in Malaysia
Girls' schools in Malaysia
Publicly funded schools in Malaysia